Keith Peters may refer to:

 Keith Peters (rugby league) (born 1986), Papua New Guinean rugby league player
 Keith Peters (physician) (born 1938), Regius Professor of Physic at Cambridge University
 Keith Peters (footballer) (born 1915), former English footballer